A dog watch is a type of shift used aboard ships.

Dog watch may also refer to:
Dogwatch (film), a 1996 American action crime thriller film
Dog Watch (1945 film), a 1945 animated short
Dogwatch Saddle, a geographic feature in Victoria Land, Antarctica
Dogwatching, a 1986 book written by Desmond Morris